Peter Elter (born 10 June 1958) is a former professional tennis player from West Germany.

During his career, Elter did not win any singles titles but finished runner-up on three occasions. He achieved a career-high singles ranking of world No. 51 in October 1982.

Elter played in four ties for the West German Davis Cup team between 1978 and 1981.

ATP career finals

Singles: 3 (3 runner-ups)

Doubles: 1 (1 runner-up)

References

External links
 
 
 

1958 births
Living people
Tennis players from Frankfurt
West German male tennis players